The 1960–61 daytime network television schedule for the three major English-language commercial broadcast networks in the United States covers the weekday daytime hours from September 1960 to August 1961.

Talk shows are highlighted in yellow, local programming is white, reruns of prime-time programming are orange, game shows are pink, soap operas are chartreuse, news programs are gold and all others are light blue. New series are highlighted in bold.

Monday-Friday

Saturday

Sunday

See also
1960-61 United States network television schedule (prime-time)
1960-61 United States network television schedule (late night)

Sources
 https://web.archive.org/web/20071015122215/http://curtalliaume.com/abc_day.html
 https://web.archive.org/web/20071015122235/http://curtalliaume.com/cbs_day.html
 https://web.archive.org/web/20071012211242/http://curtalliaume.com/nbc_day.html
 Castleman & Podrazik, The TV Schedule Book, McGraw-Hill Paperbacks, 1984
 Hyatt, The Encyclopedia Of Daytime Television, Billboard Books, 1997
 TV schedules, NEW YORK TIMES, September 1960-September 1961 (microfilm)

United States weekday network television schedules
1960 in American television
1961 in American television